Mangelia sparsa is an extinct species of sea snail, a marine gastropod mollusk in the family Mangeliidae.

Description
The length of the shell attains 7 mm.

Distribution
This extinct marine species was found in Middle Miocene strata in Hungary.

References

External links
 Worldwide Mollusc Species Data Base : Mangelia sparsa

sparsa
Gastropods described in 1901